Arcovia City (sometimes styled ArcoVia City) is a mixed-use development in Ugong, Pasig, Metro Manila, the Philippines. It is a  riverside township located by the Marikina River east of Ortigas Center being developed by the Megaworld Corporation. 

The centerpiece of the development is a triumphal arch surmounted by a bronze sculpture of a charioteer emperor accompanied by three horses called the Arco de Emperador. When completed, the township will have residential condominiums, a retail hub, LEED-registered office towers and over a thousand trees dotting the mixed-use community making it the greenest urban development by Megaworld to date.

Location

Arcovia City is located along Eulogio Rodriguez Jr. Avenue (C-5 Road) in Barangay Ugong, some  down the same road from Eastwood City, Megaworld's flagship project. It is immediately east of the Valle Verde gated community on the west bank of the Marikina River at Ugong's border with Barangays Rosario and Caniogan. The development is in a former industrial area that has undergone rapid gentrification in recent years. It is flanked by car dealerships (Toyota, Mitsubishi, Subaru and Peugeot). It is connected to the Ortigas Center business district via Lanuza Avenue and Julia Vargas Avenue and is neighbored by other mixed-use communities such as Ortigas East (former Frontera Verde, known for Tiendesitas) and The Grove by Rockwell to the north. It is also linked to the old city center or poblacion of Pasig (Barangays San Nicolas, Malinao and San Jose) via the  Kaginhawaan Bridge built in October 2017. The development also has its own bike lane network around the township, as well as bike rental services, making it a popular spot for recreational cycling.

History
The land the development sits on is a former seasoning production plant owned by Ajinomoto Philippines (former Union Ajinomoto Inc.). The Ugong plant had been in operation since 1962 but was closed down in October 2007. The idle factory was then transferred by its owner Leonardo Ty to a real estate affiliate, the Union Ajinomoto Realty Corporation, which was then renamed Woodside Greentown Properties Inc. In August 2013, Megaworld Corporation acquired 100% ownership of the company including its former Ajinomoto plant in Pasig.

The development was announced in March 2014 as Megaworld's seventh township in Metro Manila and ninth in the country. Megaworld also announced the company's interest in future acquisitions of surrounding lots for possible expansion of the township. In February 2019, an iconic archway representing the Filipinos' aspirations for success was unveiled to welcome visitors to the new township. The township won Best Mixed-Use Development in the 2019 Philippine Property Awards.

On September 7, 2022, Megaworld and the Bicol Isarog Transport System inaugurated a transportation hub inside of the Arcovia township. Through the transportation hub, Bicol Isarog plies daily night passenger routes and cargo services between Arcovia and the cities of Naga and Albay and the municipality of Nabua in the Bicol Region.

Developments
Arcovia City will house the following developments in different stages of planning and construction:

Arco de Emperador

It is the Philippines' tallest monument and one of the first triumphal arches in the country that was completed in February 2019. The archway was designed by Spanish sculptor Ginés Serrán-Pagán in 2013 who started work on the bronze sculptures in 2015. It was patterned after the Arco de la Victoria in Madrid, Spain.

The iconic landmark takes its name from both the sister company of the developer, Emperador brandy, and the Spanish and Filipino word for "emperor." It stands on a traffic circle in the middle of the township and consists of bronze sculptures of a fictitious Filipino emperador on a chariot drawn by three horses perched on top of the archway. The chariot is flanked by two bronze lions and two 24-karat gold angels blowing trumpets. The sculptural group forms a pyramid composition and is said to symbolize power, strength, passion and self-made success of ordinary Filipinos.

Arco de Emperador also has waterfall and fountain features and is surrounded by a landscaped plaza with benches. A museum is also planned for the basement of the archway.

Arcovia Parade
Arcovia Parade is the retail component of the Arcovia City development which opened in early 2019. It is a dining strip that houses the first Popeyes branch in the Philippines since it closed in 2007, a branch of Cebu-based Seafood City, McDonald's, Starbucks and a Landers Superstore.

One Paseo

The development began construction in 2018 and was designed by Skidmore, Owings and Merrill.

Residential developments

18 Avenue de Triomphe
The first residential tower in Arcovia City is a 37-storey condominium building with 576 units named 18 Avenue de Triomphe. The  development was launched in 2018 with a target date of completion by 2023.

Arcovia Palazzo
The second residential development in Arcovia will feature three condominium towers, namely the 40-storey Altea Tower, the 45-storey Benissa Tower and the 49-storey Cantabria Tower. It will have a total of 1,472 units and is expected to be completed in 2025.

References

External links
 Official website of Arcovia City

Mixed-use developments in Metro Manila
Buildings and structures in Pasig
Planned communities in the Philippines
Redeveloped ports and waterfronts in the Philippines
Marikina River